Wojciech Fibak (popularly Wojtek Fibak ; born 30 August 1952) is a former professional tennis player and Polish entrepreneur and art collector. Fibak is best known for his doubles success with Dutch pro Tom Okker and Australian Kim Warwick, although he also reached the Top 10 in singles.

Biography and personal life
Born in Poznań, Poland, he won his first tournament in 1976, and between then and 1982 won 15 singles titles and 52 doubles titles. His best year was arguably 1980, when he reached the quarter-finals at the French Open, the US Open and Wimbledon. Fibak's career singles win–loss record was 520–310, and he reached his career-high singles ranking of World No. 10 on 25 July 1977. His highest doubles ranking was World No. 2, which he reached in February 1979. He was consistently ranked in the top 20 in singles, and earned $2,725,403 in career prize money.

The highlight of his career was winning the Australian Open Men's Doubles in 1978 with Kim Warwick. They beat Paul Kronk and Cliff Letcher 7–6, 7–5 to take the title.

In 1983 he was banned from his local Poznań tennis club and faced reduced involvement from the Polish Tennis Federation and Davis Cup national team for his opposition to the communist PZPR government.

In 1985, Fibak founded the Polish Tennis Club (Polish Tennis Association of Southern California); in the 1990s he was head of the Polish Tennis Federation and widely credited with popularising the sport in his native country. After the fall of communism in the early 1990s his company Fibak Press acquired the regional former PZPR mouthpiece Gazeta Poznańska, until it was acquired by rivals Głos Wielkopolski in 2006, and published several other newspapers and magazines as well as being involved in books related to tennis.

He is also a businessman and an avid art collector, and used his tennis fortune to open the art gallery Galeria Fibak in 2001.

Fibak divides his time between Warsaw and Monaco, where he was Poland's honorary consul. He is a self-declared local patriot and was close to fellow local billionaire Jan Kulczyk.

He has three daughters: Agnieszka, Paulina, and Nina.

Grand Slam finals

Doubles: 2 (1 title, 1 runner-up)

Career finals

Doubles (52 titles, 33 runners-up)

Singles (15 titles, 19 runners-up)

Grand Slam doubles performance timeline

References

External links
 
 
 

1952 births
Living people
Sportspeople from Poznań
Polish male tennis players
Grand Slam (tennis) champions in men's doubles
Polish chief executives
Polish company founders
Businesspeople from Poznań
Polish billionaires
Australian Open (tennis) champions